Saint-Georges-Motel is a commune in the Eure department in Normandy in northern France.

Population

Notable residents

The early 17th-century Château Saint-Georges-Motel, is a 10,000-square-foot castle surrounded by a moat on a 235-acre property that includes eighteen outbuildings.  King Henry IV spent the night on the estate before winning the Battle of Ivry that united France.

In the 1920s, the château was purchased as a summer house by American heiress Consuelo Vanderbilt when she was married to the French aviator and industrialist Jacques Balsan, after her divorce from Charles Spencer-Churchill, 9th Duke of Marlborough.  While Consuelo owned the château, Prime Minister Winston Churchill was a frequent visitor.  Vanderbilt's ownership of the château inspired her mother, Alva Belmont to purchase the Château d'Augerville.

The château was listed for sale for $8.21 million in 2017 by its then owners, Catherine Hamilton, president of the American Friends of Versailles, and her husband, David Hamilton, a Houston-raised, Chicago-based businessman. They purchased the château in the late 1980s for $6 million.

See also
Communes of the Eure department

References

Communes of Eure